Breznakia blatticola is a Gram-positive and obligately anaerobic bacterium from the genus of Breznakia which has been isolated from the hindgut of the cockroach Shelfordella lateralis in Germany.

References

Erysipelotrichia
Bacteria described in 2016